Marcos Roberto Gómes (born 26 January 1994) is a professional Brazilian professional footballer who plays as a midfielder. He previously played for Potros UAEM.

References

External links
 

1994 births
Living people
Sportspeople from Paraná (state)
Association football midfielders
Brazilian footballers
Potros UAEM footballers
Ascenso MX players
Brazilian expatriate footballers
Brazilian expatriate sportspeople in Mexico
Expatriate footballers in Mexico